Stephen John Perryman MBE (born 21 December 1951) is an English former professional footballer who is best-known for his successes with Tottenham Hotspur during the 1970s and early 1980s. He has won the FA Cup, League Cup, and UEFA Cup all twice with Tottenham in his 17 years at the club. Perryman was voted Football Writers' Association Footballer of the Year in 1982 and made a club record 854 first team appearances for Tottenham. He was the director of football at Exeter City from 2003 until his temporary retirement in March 2018.

Playing career

Perryman was born in Ealing, Middlesex. A midfielder and later defender, he played in a club record 866 first team appearances in all competitions for Tottenham Hotspur between 1969 and 1986 and was their longest serving player. During his seventeen-year career with the north London club, Perryman collected many medals, winning the UEFA Cup in 1972 and 1984 (playing in both legs of the 1972 final and just the first leg of the 1984 final as he was suspended for the second), and the League Cup in 1971 and 1973. He followed in the footsteps of Joe Harvey and Danny Blanchflower and skippered Tottenham to successive FA Cup wins in 1981 and 1982. Perryman was also voted the Football Writers' Association Footballer of the Year in 1982.

Perryman did not score often even by the standards of contemporary midfielders, however he scored both goals in a 2–1 home win over A.C. Milan in the 1972 UEFA Cup semi-final first leg. Spurs went on to win the round 3–2 on aggregate, and then won the title, defeating Wolverhampton Wanderers in the final.

After leaving White Hart Lane Perryman moved to Oxford United in March 1986, but was cup-tied for their victory in the 1986 Football League Cup Final. He then played for Brentford as player-manager in the same year, before retiring in 1990.

Coaching career
Perryman became manager of Watford from 1990–93 saving them from relegation in the early years, before managing Start in Norway (1995), Shimizu S-Pulse, (1999–2000) and Kashiwa Reysol in Japan (2001–2002). He also served as caretaker manager for Spurs in November 1994.
As a coach, he has won the J.League stage championship (1999 2nd Stage) and the Asian Cup Winners Cup (2000), both with Shimizu S-Pulse. He then worked at Exeter City with no official title to help them stay in the then football Division 3. After this he returned to Japan to manage J.League side Kashiwa Reysol.

Perryman lent his name to a brand of Sports stores in the 1980s which were concentrated in the West London area and sported the Tottenham Hotspur cockerel. There were stores in Uxbridge, Ruislip, Greenford, Hayes and Hayes Town (Middlesex). A store in Bergen, Norway, also opened in the early 1980s, which is still operating.

Between 2003 and 2018, Perryman was director of football for Exeter City. On 5 May 2012, while watching Exeter's final game of the 2011–12 season against Sheffield United at St James Park he became unwell and was taken to Derriford Hospital in Plymouth where he underwent successful heart surgery. A month later he revealed that he might have died if it had not been for the instant medical support available at the ground, and he spent three weeks in a coma on life support.

In January 2018, Perryman announced that he would retire as Exeter City's Director of Football at the end of the 2017–18 season. However, in August of that year, Perryman joined former Exeter City manager Paul Tisdale at MK Dons, becoming an associate director of the club until November 2019 when Tisdale left.

International career
After 17 matches for England U23, Perryman made a solitary appearance for England, appearing as a 70th-minute substitute against Iceland on 2 June 1982. The game was originally an England B fixture but was subsequently upgraded to full international status meaning Perryman was awarded his cap.

Personal life
Perryman has been married twice, with four children. He is close friends with Ossie Ardiles. He lives in Kington St Michael. Perryman is a Labour Party supporter.

He was appointed Member of the Order of the British Empire (MBE) in the 1986 Birthday Honours, "for services to association football".

Career statistics

Club

Managerial statistics

Honours

Player
Tottenham Hotspur
FA Cup: 1980–81, 1981–82
League Cup: 1970–71, 1972–73
FA Charity Shield: 1981 (shared)
UEFA Cup: 1971–72, 1983–84
Anglo-Italian League Cup: 1971
FA Youth Cup: 1969–70

Manager
Shimizu S-Pulse
J1 League: 1999 Second stage champions, runner-up Suntory Championship
Asian Cup Winners' Cup: 1999–2000

Individual
FWA Footballer of the Year: 1982
J. League Manager of the Year: 1999

Notes

References

External links

 

Great players – Steve Perryman at TottenhamHotspur.com

1951 births
Association football defenders
Association football midfielders
Brentford F.C. managers
Brentford F.C. players
British expatriate sportspeople in Norway
England international footballers
England under-23 international footballers
England youth international footballers
English footballers
English Football League players
English football managers
Exeter City F.C. managers
Exeter City F.C. non-playing staff
Expatriate football managers in Japan
Expatriate football managers in Norway
FA Cup Final players
Footballers from Ealing
IK Start managers
J1 League managers
Kashiwa Reysol managers
Living people
Members of the Order of the British Empire
Oxford United F.C. players
Premier League managers
Shimizu S-Pulse managers
Tottenham Hotspur F.C. managers
Tottenham Hotspur F.C. players
UEFA Cup winning players
Watford F.C. managers